Physical Review Fluids is a peer-reviewed scientific journal, published monthly by the American Physical Society. The journal focuses on fluid dynamics and also covers geophysical fluid dynamics, biofluid dynamics, nanofluidics and magnetohydrodynamics. Its lead editors are Eric Lauga (University of Cambridge) and Beverley McKeon (California Institute of Technology).  

The journal launced in January 2016 and published its 500th article in 2017.

Abstracting and indexing 
The journal is abstracted and indexed in different databases, including:
Current Contents/Physical, Chemical & Earth Sciences
Inspec
Science Citation Index Expanded
Scopus

According to the Journal Citation Reports, the journal has a 2021 impact factor of 2.895.

References

External links
 

Fluid dynamics journals
English-language journals
Monthly journals
American Physical Society academic journals
Publications established in 2016